Heterocrossa adreptella is a moth of the Carposinidae family. This species was long considered the New Zealand raspberry budmoth however this was a taxonomic misinterpretation of the type material used to describe this species. This error was corrected in 1988 with the New Zealand raspberry budmoth giving its own species name Heterocrossa rubophaga. H. adreptella is endemic to New Zealand and has been collected in the Wellington Botanic Garden and been observed resting on mānuka branches.

Taxonomy

This species was first described by Francis Walker in 1864 and originally named Gelechia adreptella. Walker used specimens collected by D. Bolton in Auckland. In papers published in 1882 and 1883, Edward Meyrick misinterpreted Walker's type material and as a result Heterorcrossa adreptella was long considered the New Zealand raspberry budmoth. The New Zealand raspberry moth is in fact a different species from H. adreptella and is now known as Heterocrossa rubophaga. This error was corrected by John S. Dugdale in 1988. Dugdale, in the same publication, also synonymised Heterocrossa charaxias with H. adreptella. In 1928 George Hudson discussed and illustrated this species in his book The butterflies and moths of New Zealand under the name Carposina charaxias. Also in 1928 Alfred Philpott discussed and illustrated the male genitalia of H. charaxias. These illustrations, in the opinion of Dugdale, were in agreement with the genitalia slide of the holotype specimen of H. adreptella. The male holotype specimen is held at the Natural History Museum, London.

Description

Walker originally described this species as follows:

Hudson described this species as follows:

This species can be distinguished from H. rubophaga as the hindwing anal area of adult specimens of H. adreptella have broad, yellowish scales present.  There are also differences in the shape of the male genitalia of these species.

Distribution 
This species is endemic to New Zealand. It has been collected at the Wellington Botanic Garden, resting on mānuaka branches. It has also been collected in Otago.

Behaviour 
Adults of this species are on the wing in November.

References

Carposinidae
Moths of New Zealand
Endemic fauna of New Zealand
Moths described in 1864
Taxa named by Francis Walker (entomologist)
Endemic moths of New Zealand